The Vuelta Ciclista del Uruguay is a stage cycling race held annually in Uruguay. It was created in 1939 and is part of the UCI America Tour in category 2.2.

Winners

References

External links
 

Cycle races in Uruguay
Recurring sporting events established in 1939
1939 establishments in Uruguay
UCI America Tour races
Autumn events in Uruguay